Jorma Etelälahti (born 17 November 1951) is a Finnish former nordic combined skier. He earned a silver in the 3 x 10 km team event at the 1982 FIS Nordic World Ski Championships in Oslo. He also competed at the 1976 Winter Olympics and the 1980 Winter Olympics.

References

External links

1951 births
Living people
FIS Nordic World Ski Championships medalists in Nordic combined
Finnish male Nordic combined skiers
Olympic Nordic combined skiers of Finland
Nordic combined skiers at the 1976 Winter Olympics
Nordic combined skiers at the 1980 Winter Olympics
20th-century Finnish people